Ooh Ahh or Ooh Aah may refer to:

 Ooh Ahh (EP), an extended play by GRITS
 "Ooh Ahh" (GRITS song)
 "Ooh Ahh" (Tamara Jaber song)
 "Ooh Aah... Just a Little Bit", a song by Gina G
 "Oooh Ahh", a song by Danity Kane from their self-titled album

See also
 Ooh, Aah & You, a series of short programs for children
 Ooh arr